The Samsung Z3 is a smartphone produced by Samsung. It is the second smartphone to be shipped with the Tizen operating system (after the Samsung Z1). The phone was released on October 21, 2015.

The phone was succeeded by the Samsung Z2 in August 2016.

References

Samsung mobile phones
Tizen-based devices
Mobile phones introduced in 2015
Discontinued smartphones